Kullu–Manali Airport , also called Bhuntar Airport is a domestic airport serving the cities of Kullu and Manali in the Indian state of Himachal Pradesh. The airport is located at Bhuntar, 11 km from Kullu town and 52 km from Manali.

The airport is considered a challenging airport for pilots because of its single runway set in a deep valley whose peaks rise several thousand feet higher than the runway. Also, the airport is located on the banks of the river Beas, and in 1995, its flash floods posed a threat to the runway. The new air terminal at Bhuntar was inaugurated in 2008, and the airport apron enlarged to park two aircraft at a time. Kingfisher Airlines ceased operations in September 2012 while Air India Regional resumed its operations to Kullu in May 2013. Himalayan Bulls in collaboration with Deccan Charters has commenced Kullu-Chandigarh-Kullu flights thrice a day from 2 April 2014.

Upgrades
In order to strengthen air connectivity in the state, the Himachal Pradesh Government plans to upgrade the airport. The Indian Institute of Technology, (IIT) Roorkee has prepared a detailed feasibility report for expanding the airport runway by 550 metres at a cost of Rs. 248 crore. The Airports Authority of India (AAI), which operates the airport, has planned an extension of another 60 metres.

Airlines and destinations

Statistics

References

External links 
 IAF's ALG
 Air Marshal K. K. Nohwar, Pace of Infrastructure Development in Border Areas: Adequate?, Centre for Air Power Studies, 13 March 2018
 
 Kullu Manali Airport  at Airports Authority of India web site
 Himalayan Bulls

Airports in Himachal Pradesh
Buildings and structures in Kullu district
Transport in Manali, Himachal Pradesh
Airports with year of establishment missing